McGeouch is a surname. Notable people with the surname include:

 Darren McGeouch (born 1990), Scottish footballer
 Dylan McGeouch (born 1993), Scottish footballer

See also
 McGeoch
 McGeough